Darius Khondji  (born 21 October 1955) is an Iranian-French cinematographer. Khondji has worked with a number of high-profile directors, including David Fincher, Woody Allen, Jean-Pierre Jeunet, Gus Van Sant, Roman Polanski, Wong Kar-wai, Michael Haneke, Danny Boyle, Stephen Frears, Philippe Parreno, Bong Joon-ho, Nicolas Winding Refn, Paul Thomas Anderson, Wes Anderson, Jonathan Glazer, Pablo Larraín, the Safdie brothers, Alejandro G. Iñárritu and James Gray. He has been nominated for two Academy Awards, a BAFTA Award and three César Awards.

Early life and education
Khondji was born in Tehran, Iran, to an Iranian father and a French mother. At an early age, his family relocated in France. He became interested in film early on and made Super-8 films in his teens. Later in life, he moved to the United States to study at UCLA and then majored in film from New York University and the International Center of Photography. During this period, two teachers influenced his decision to become a cinematographer: Jonas Mekas and Haig Manoogian (Martin Scorsese's film teacher). He realized that "all I wanted to do was shoot the other students' films. I was concerned with the power of the image and much less with story."

Career

After his time in the United States, Khondji returned to France in 1981 and worked as an assistant for cinematographers like Bruno Nuytten, Martin Schafer and Pascal Marti. He also worked as a lighting director on music videos and commercials.

His second feature film was Le tresor des Iles Chiennes (1991), a low budget, black and white, post-atomic adventure film. His work on this movie was significant enough to warrant the Cahiers du cinéma to publish one of its rare interviews with a cinematographer. It was on this film that he demonstrated an affinity for Cinemascope. He remarked in an interview, "I think it's the most beautiful format to frame. One can become absorbed in the faces when they're framed in 'Scope." His subsequent work on Delicatessen established his international reputation and earned him a Cesar nomination for Best Cinematography. One of his highest profile films was Seven which he got based on a Nike ad he shot with David Fincher and his work on Delicatessen.  His work on Evita was nominated for an Oscar for the Best Cinematography.

Darius worked on three European-shot films by Woody Allen: Midnight in Paris (2011), To Rome with Love (2012) and Magic in the Moonlight (2014).

In 2012, Khondji shot the Palme D'or-winning film Amour, which also won the Academy Award for Best Foreign Language Film and was nominated for Best Picture.

Creative inspiration
Khondji cites Gregg Toland as his favorite cinematographer. "I particularly admire his work on John Ford's The Grapes of Wrath." He also greatly admires James Wong Howe's work, in particular Hud. Khondji has said that his dream project would be "a 16mm black and white film of On the Road!"

Personal life
Khondji is married to Marianne Chemetov, a daughter of the French architect Paul Chemetov, and has three children: Marie-Louise, Josephine, and Alexandre.

Filmography

Film

Short films

Television

Music videos

Awards and nominations

Exhibitions 
 2010: Discovery award laureate and exhibition at Les Rencontres d'Arles festival, France.

References

External links 
 
 An interview with Darius Khondji

French cinematographers
Iranian people of French descent
Iranian cinematographers
People from Tehran
1955 births
Living people
Tisch School of the Arts alumni
Iranian emigrants to France
University of California, Los Angeles alumni
Iranian diaspora film people